Janez Marič (born August 10, 1975 in Ribno, Slovenia) is a Slovenian former biathlete.

Marič represented Slovenia at the 2002, 2006,  2010 and 2014 Winter Olympics.

He retired after the 2014–15 season.

References

1975 births
Living people
Slovenian male biathletes
Biathletes at the 2002 Winter Olympics
Biathletes at the 2006 Winter Olympics
Biathletes at the 2010 Winter Olympics
Biathletes at the 2014 Winter Olympics
Olympic biathletes of Slovenia
People from the Municipality of Bled
21st-century Slovenian people